Eucosmomorpha nearctica is a moth of the family Tortricidae. It is found in North America, including Kentucky, Michigan, Mississippi, North Carolina and Saskatchewan.

The length of the forewings is 3.8–5.5 mm.

External links
 A New Species of Eucosmomorpha from North America
 mothphotographersgroup

Olethreutinae
Moths of North America
Moths described in 2002